Miss America's Outstanding Teen 2023 was the 16th annual Miss America's Outstanding Teen pageant held on August 12, 2022 at the Hyatt Regency Dallas in Dallas, Texas. The preliminary competition was be held on August 10 & 11, 2022. This was the first time the national pageant was not be held in Orlando, Florida.

Marcelle LeBlanc of Alabama crowned her successor, Morgan Greco of Washington, at the end of the event. Marked this was a non-consecutive win for Washington, the last time was in 2020.

Judges 
On August 1, 2022, the Miss America Organization announced their panelists for this years national pageant on social media platforms. They are:

 Monica Aldama - head coach for Navarro College's co-ed cheer team from the show Cheer on Netflix
 Nia Imani Franklin - Miss America 2019 and music composer
 James Aguiar - VP Fashion & Creative Director for Modern Luxury
 Nicole Phelps - Miss California USA 2010 and mental health advocate
 Shilah Phillips - Miss Texas 2006 and singer

Results Summary

Placements

Awards

Preliminary Awards

Teens in Action

Other Outstanding Teen Awards

Contestants 

References

2023
2022 beauty pageants